Gerald Francis Kazanowski (born October 12, 1960) is a former professional and Canadian Olympic basketball player.

Born in Nanaimo, British Columbia, Kazanowski was British Columbia High School Basketball Association provincial tournament MVP in 1978 as a member of Nanaimo High School.  He played college basketball for the University of Victoria Vikes.  He was named a three-time CIAU All-Canadian, two-time recipient of the Premier's Athletic Award, and member of four consecutive CIAU championship Vikes teams, 1980 through 1983.  Kazanowski graduated with a degree in economics and was drafted in the 7th round of the 1983 NBA Draft by the Utah Jazz (his name was listed as Joe Kazanowski).

The 6-foot, 9-inch centre/forward, Kazanowski first played for the national team at the 1979 FIBA World Junior Championship.  He played in three World University Games, 1981, '83, and '85.  The 1983 games played in Edmonton saw the Canadians upset the United States and Yugoslavia to win gold.  He participated in three FIBA World Championships, 1982, 1986, and 1990.  He also participated against the original Dream Team at the 1992 FIBA Tournament of the Americas as Canada fell to the Americans in round-robin play 61-101.  Kazanowski played in two Olympic Games too, in 1984, when a depleted field due to boycott saw Canada finish just outside the medals in fourth place, and in 1988.

Kazanowski played professionally from 1984 through 1992 with stops for clubs in Spain (Joventut and Baloncesto León), Sweden, Finland, Switzerland, Luxembourg, Argentina and Mexico.  He was inducted into both the Naismith Museum and Hall of Fame in 2005 and Basketball BC Hall of Fame in 2006.

As of 2006, Kazanowski continued to live on Vancouver Island (he has at various times lived in Sidney and Saanichton) with his wife Claudia and daughters Sarah and Grace.  He is a certified financial advisor.

In 2008, Gerald was inducted into the Nanaimo Sports hall of fame.

References
basketball.bc.ca
www.tsn.ca
www.fiba.com
www.angelfire.com
Canadian Olympic Committee webpage profile (with photos)
www.elpais.com

1960 births
Living people
Baloncesto León players
Basketball people from British Columbia
Basketball players at the 1984 Summer Olympics
Basketball players at the 1988 Summer Olympics
Canadian expatriate basketball people in Argentina
Canadian expatriate basketball people in Finland
Canadian expatriate basketball people in Mexico
Canadian expatriate basketball people in Spain
Canadian expatriate basketball people in Sweden
Canadian expatriate basketball people in Switzerland
Canadian expatriate basketball people in Luxembourg
Canadian men's basketball players
1982 FIBA World Championship players
1990 FIBA World Championship players
Centers (basketball)
Joventut Badalona players
Liga ACB players
Olympic basketball players of Canada
People from the Capital Regional District
Power forwards (basketball)
SAM Basket players
Sportspeople from Nanaimo
Utah Jazz draft picks
Victoria Vikes basketball players
Universiade medalists in basketball
Universiade gold medalists for Canada
Universiade bronze medalists for Canada
Medalists at the 1983 Summer Universiade
Medalists at the 1985 Summer Universiade